The 2019 Afghanistan Provincial Challenge Cup was a List A cricket competition that took place in Afghanistan between 31 July and 10 August 2019. It was the third year of domestic List A cricket to be played in Afghanistan, following the announcements by the International Cricket Council (ICC) in February and May 2017. Eight teams qualified for the tournament, and were divided into two groups of four.

Nangarhar Province won the tournament, after beating Kabul Province by six wickets in the final, with Najeeb Tarakai scoring a century.

Points table

Pool A

 Team qualified for the finals

Pool B

 Team qualified for the finals

Fixtures

Group A

Group B

Finals

References

External links
 Series home at ESPN Cricinfo

Ghazi